Wright's Cove is a cove on the Dartmouth side of  Bedford Basin in Halifax Harbour  Nova Scotia Canada within the Halifax Regional Municipality. Located in the cove is the Dartmouth Yacht Club, an Ultramar wharf, a Gypsum loading facility operated by National Gypsum Company and a Canadian Forces armament depot .
The cove is sheltered from Bedford Basin by Navy Island and Sheppard's Island.  It is the birthplace of George Henry Wright.

External links
 Wright's Cove Map Dartmouth Yacht Club 

Coves of Canada
Landforms of Halifax, Nova Scotia
Bays of Nova Scotia
Landforms of Halifax County, Nova Scotia